"March Madness" is a song recorded by American rapper Future. It was released on August 31, 2015, as the lead single of his mixtape 56 Nights (2015).  The song was certified Platinum by the Recording Industry Association of America (RIAA) on May 26, 2017, for selling over 1,000,000 digital copies in the United States. The song is ranked as one of the 100 songs that defined the 2010s decade by Billboard.

Release 
The song premiered online on March 16, 2015. Future released the mixtape 56 Nights on March 21, 2015. "March Madness" became available for digital download on iTunes on August 31, 2015.

Remix
A remix was released featuring a new verse by American rapper Nas.

Music video
A music video for the track premiered on March 31, 2015. It was directed by Vincent Lou.

Charts

Certifications

References

Future (rapper) songs
2015 songs
2015 singles
Epic Records singles
Songs written by Future (rapper)
Trap music songs